HMS Katherine (or Catherine) has been the name of various ships of the British Royal Navy:

, a ship purchased in 1402 and scrapped in 1406
, a ship purchased in 1415 and sold in 1425
, a 36-gun ship captured in 1653 and sold in 1658
, an 8-gun yacht launched in 1661 and lost in 1673
, an 82-gun second rate launched in 1664, also known as Royal Katherine from 1696, renamed Ramillies in 1706, and wrecked in 1760
, the name of two fireships purchased in 1672, one of which was expended in 1672 and the other in 1673
, an 8-gun yacht launched in 1674, renamed Catherine in 1720, and sold in 1801
, a storeship purchased in 1692 and sold in 1701
, a fireship, in service until 1801

Katherine, HMS
Catherine, HMS